Alexander Schacht (November 11, 1892 – July 14, 1984) was an American professional baseball player, coach, and, later, restaurateur. Schacht was a pitcher in the major leagues from 1919 to 1921 for the Washington Senators.

Early life
Schacht was born in New York City, New York, where he attended the High School of Commerce.

Baseball career

Although he compiled a 14–10 won/loss mark (with a 4.48 earned run average) in his three-year MLB pitching career and was highly regarded as a third-base coach, Schacht's ability to mimic other players from the coaching lines, and his comedy routines with fellow Washington coach Nick Altrock, earned him the nickname of "The Clown Prince of Baseball". Ironically, at the height of their collaboration, Schacht and Altrock developed a deep personal animosity and stopped speaking to each other off the field. During their famous comic re-enactments of the Dempsey–Tunney championship boxing match, many speculated that they pulled no punches as they rained blows on each other.

After 11 seasons (1924–34) as a Senator coach, Schacht broke up his act with Altrock to follow Washington manager Joe Cronin to the Boston Red Sox, where Schacht coached at third base in 1935–36. He then focused on a solo career as a baseball entertainer.

Restaurant
Following World War II, Schacht went into the restaurant business.  His eponymous steakhouse at 102 E. 52nd Street (at Park Avenue) in Manhattan was popular for decades, catering to a clientele of sports stars and stage and screen celebrities.  The menus at Al Schacht's were round, fashioned as oversized baseballs, and featured dishes named after old-time players.  From time to time, Schacht would mount the small restaurant stage and launch into his old routines, to the delight of patrons. The restaurant's exterior appears in the 1961 movie Breakfast at Tiffany's.

Personal life
Schacht was Jewish. After WWII, Al met and married Mabelle Radcliffe, a vocalist who went by the stage name Mabelle Russell. They eventually moved to Southbury, CT and lived there until his death in 1984. Mabelle died in 1995.

Jewish heritage
Schacht, wrote: "There is talk that I am Jewish—just because my father was Jewish, my mother is Jewish, I speak Yiddish, and once studied to be a rabbi and a cantor.  Well, that's how rumors get started."

References

External links

1892 births
1984 deaths
Boston Red Sox coaches
Jewish American baseball players
Jewish Major League Baseball players
Major League Baseball pitchers
Major League Baseball third base coaches
Baseball players from New York City
Washington Senators (1901–1960) coaches
Washington Senators (1901–1960) players
20th-century American Jews
Yiddish-speaking people